Stradale (Italian for "road-going") may refer to:

 Alfa Romeo 33 Stradale, street-legal derivative of a racecar
 Dallara Stradale, first streetcar from racecar maker Dallara
 Ferrari SF90 Stradale
 Maserati GranTurismo MC Stradale
 Lancia 037 Stradale

See also